Arhopala epimuta is a species of butterfly belonging to the lycaenid family described by Frederic Moore in 1858. It is found in  Southeast Asia (Burma, Thailand, Borneo, Peninsular Malaya, Singapore and Sumatra).

Subspecies
Arhopala epimuta epimuta (Borneo)
Arhopala epimuta epiala Corbet, 1941 (Peninsular Malaysia, Singapore, Sumatra)
Arhopala epimuta elsiei Evans, [1925] (Burma, Thailand)

References

Arhopala
Butterflies described in 1858
Butterflies of Asia
Taxa named by Frederic Moore